The 2021 Meus Prêmios Nick Awards took place on September 28, 2021, in São Paulo, Brazil via Nickeldoeon. As in the previous year the awards were held virtually and were hosted by the internet personalities Bianca Andrade and Fred. The ceremony, in addition to being broadcast on the channel, was broadcast live on YouTube and Facebook.

Winners and nominees 
On August 2, the pre-nominees were announced and voting to elect the nominees began until August 19. As of the aforementioned date, the voting to elect the winners began and will end on September 12. South Korean group BTS is the most nominated act of this edition with 5 nominations.

References

External links
Official website

Nickelodeon Kids' Choice Awards
Brazilian awards
2021 music awards